The 2017 Seattle Sounders FC season was the club's ninth season in Major League Soccer, the United States' top-tier of professional soccer. The Sounders entered the 2017 season as the defending MLS Cup champions. The 2017 season is Brian Schmetzer's first full MLS season as head coach of the Sounders.

Background

Current roster

Competitions

Preseason

2017 Desert Friendlies

2017 Carolina Challenge Cup

Major League Soccer

League tables

Western Conference

Overall

Results summary

Results by matchday

Matches

MLS Cup Playoffs

Western Conference Semifinals

Western Conference Finals

MLS Cup Final

Mid-season friendlies

U.S. Open Cup

Statistics

Appearances and goals 

Numbers after plus-sign(+) denote appearances as a substitute.

|-
|colspan="14"|Players who left the club during the season:

[S2] – S2 player

Top scorers 
{| class="wikitable" style="font-size: 95%; text-align: center;"
|-
!width=30|Place
!width=30|Position
!width=30|Number
!width=175|Name
!width=75|
!width=75|
!width=75|
!width=75|Total
|-
|rowspan="1"|1
|FW
|2
|align=left| Clint Dempsey
|12
|3
|0
|15
|-
|rowspan="1"|2
|FW
|17
|align=left| Will Bruin
|11
|2
|0
|13
|-
|rowspan="1"|3
|MF
|10
|align=left| Nicolás Lodeiro
|7
|0
|0
|7
|-
|rowspan="1"|4
|MF
|7
|align=left| Cristian Roldan
|6
|0
|0
|6
|-
|rowspan="2"|5
|MF
|8
|align=left| Víctor Rodríguez
|2
|1
|0
|3
|-

|FW
|13
|align=left| Jordan Morris
|3
|0
|0
|3
|-
|rowspan="4"|7
|MF
|4
|align=left| Gustav Svensson
|1
|1
|0
|2
|-

|MF
|11
|align=left| Aaron Kovar
|0
|0
|2
|2
|-

|MF
|19
|align=left| Harry Shipp
|2
|0
|0
|2
|-

|MF
|27
|align=left| Lamar Neagle
|2
|0
|0
|2
|-
|rowspan="6"|11
|DF
|3
|align=left| Brad Evans
|1
|0
|0
|1
|-

|MF
|6
|align=left| Osvaldo Alonso
|1
|0
|0
|1
|-

|DF
|14
|align=left| Chad Marshall
|1
|0
|0
|1
|-

|DF
|18
|align=left| Kelvin Leerdam
|1
|0
|0
|1
|-

|MF
|32
|align=left| Zach Mathers
|0
|0
|1
|1
|-

|DF
|33
|align=left| Joevin Jones
|1
|0
|0
|1
|-
|colspan="4"|Own Goals
|1
|0
|0
|1
|-
!colspan="4"|Total
! 49
! 7
! 3
! 55

Disciplinary record 
{| class="wikitable" style="text-align:center;"
|-
| rowspan="2" !width=15|
| rowspan="2" !width=15|
| rowspan="2" !width=120|Player
| colspan="3"|MLS
| colspan="3"|MLS Cup
| colspan="3"|U.S. Open Cup
| colspan="3"|Total
|-
!width=34; background:#fe9;|
!width=34; background:#fe9;|
!width=34; background:#ff8888;|
!width=34; background:#fe9;|
!width=34; background:#fe9;|
!width=34; background:#ff8888;|
!width=34; background:#fe9;|
!width=34; background:#fe9;|
!width=34; background:#ff8888;|
!width=34; background:#fe9;|
!width=34; background:#fe9;|
!width=34; background:#ff8888;|
|-
|| 2 || |FW ||align=left| Clint Dempsey || |3|| |0|| |1|| |0|| |0|| |0|| |0|| |0|| |0|| |3|| |0|| |1
|-
|| 3 || |DF ||align=left| Brad Evans || |0|| |0|| |1|| |0|| |0|| |0|| |0|| |0|| |0|| |0|| |0|| |1
|-
|| 4 || |MF ||align=left| Gustav Svensson || |1|| |0|| |0|| |0|| |0|| |0|| |0|| |0|| |0|| |1|| |0|| |0
|-
|| 5 || |DF ||align=left| Nouhou || |1|| |0|| |1|| |2|| |0|| |0|| |0|| |0|| |0|| |3|| |0|| |1
|-
|| 6 || |MF ||align=left| Osvaldo Alonso || |3|| |0|| |0|| |0|| |0|| |0|| |0|| |0|| |0|| |3|| |0|| |0
|-
|| 7 || |MF ||align=left| Cristian Roldan || |3|| |0|| |0|| |1|| |0|| |0|| |0|| |0|| |0|| |4|| |0|| |0
|-
|| 8 || |MF ||align=left| Víctor Rodríguez || |1|| |0|| |0|| |0|| |0|| |0|| |0|| |0|| |0|| |1|| |0|| |0
|-
|| 10 || |MF ||align=left| Nicolás Lodeiro || |5|| |0|| |1|| |1|| |0|| |0|| |0|| |0|| |0|| |6|| |0|| |1
|-
|| 12 || |FW ||align=left| Seyi Adekoya || |1|| |0|| |0|| |0|| |0|| |0|| |0|| |0|| |0|| |1|| |0|| |0
|-
|| 14 || |DF ||align=left| Chad Marshall || |2|| |0|| |0|| |0|| |0|| |0|| |0|| |0|| |0|| |2|| |0|| |0
|-
|| 15 || |DF ||align=left| Tony Alfaro || |4|| |0|| |0|| |0|| |0|| |0|| |0|| |0|| |0|| |4|| |0|| |0
|-
|| 17 || |FW ||align=left| Will Bruin || |1|| |0|| |0|| |0|| |0|| |0|| |1|| |0|| |0|| |2|| |0|| |0
|-
|| 18 || |DF ||align=left| Kelvin Leerdam || |2|| |0|| |0|| |0|| |0|| |0|| |0|| |0|| |0|| |2|| |0|| |0
|-
|| 19 || |MF ||align=left| Harry Shipp || |1|| |0|| |0|| |0|| |0|| |0|| |0|| |0|| |0|| |1|| |0|| |0
|-
|| 21 || |MF ||align=left| Jordy Delem || |4|| |0|| |0|| |0|| |0|| |0|| |0|| |0|| |0|| |4|| |0|| |0
|-
|| 24 || |GK ||align=left| Stefan Frei || |2|| |0|| |0|| |0|| |0|| |0|| |0|| |0|| |0|| |2|| |0|| |0
|-
|| 27 || |FW ||align=left| Lamar Neagle || |1|| |0|| |0|| |0|| |0|| |0|| |0|| |0|| |0|| |1|| |0|| |0
|-
|| 29 || |DF ||align=left| Roman Torres || |4|| |0|| |0|| |2|| |0|| |0|| |0|| |0|| |0|| |6|| |0|| |0
|-
|| 33 || |DF ||align=left| Joevin Jones || |2|| |1|| |0|| |1|| |0|| |0|| |0|| |0|| |0|| |3|| |1|| |0
|-
|| 77 || |MF ||align=left| Francisco Narbón || |0|| |0|| |0|| |0|| |0|| |0|| |0|| |0|| |1|| |0|| |0|| |1
|-
|| 91 || |DF ||align=left| Oniel Fisher || |1|| |0|| |0|| |0|| |0|| |0|| |0|| |0|| |0|| |1|| |0|| |0
|-
|colspan="17"|Players who left the club during the season:
|-
|| 8 || |MF ||align=left| Álvaro Fernández || |1|| |0|| |0|| |0|| |0|| |0|| |0|| |0|| |0|| |1|| |0|| |0
|-
!colspan=3|Total !!43!!1!!4!!7!!0!!0!!1!!0!!1!!47!!1!!4

Honors and awards

MLS Comeback Player of the Year

MLS Goal of the Week

MLS Save of the Week

MLS Team of the Week

MLS Coach of the Week

Transfers 

For transfers in, dates listed are when Sounders FC officially signed the players to the roster. Transactions where only the rights to the players are acquired are not listed. For transfers out, dates listed are when Sounders FC officially removed the players from its roster, not when they signed with another club. If a player later signed with another club, his new club will be noted, but the date listed here remains the one when he was officially removed from Sounders FC roster.

In

Draft picks 

Draft picks are not automatically signed to the team roster. Only those who are signed to a contract will be listed as transfers in. Only trades involving draft picks and executed after the start of 2017 MLS SuperDraft will be listed in the notes.

Out

Staff

Notes 
A.  Players who are under contract with Seattle Sounders FC 2.

References 

Seattle Sounders FC seasons
Seattle Sounders
Seattle
Seattle